Chalte Chalte is a 2003 Indian Hindi-language romantic drama film starring Shah Rukh Khan and Rani Mukerji, directed by Aziz Mirza. The film was screened at the Casablanca Film Festival. It marked the last production venture of Dreamz Unlimited prior to rebranding to Red Chillies Entertainment in 2003.

Chalte Chalte released on 13 June 2003, and proved to be a commercial success at the box office, grossing ₹43.38 crore (US$5.4 million) worldwide. It received positive reviews from critics upon release, with praise for its theme, screenplay, soundtrack and the lead performances; however, some critics noted a thematic similarity between the film and Saathiya (2002), which also starred Mukerji in the lead.

At the 49th Filmfare Awards, Chalte Chalte received 5 nominations, including Best Actress (Mukerji) and Best Music Director (Jatin-Lalit).

Plot
The film begins in a bowling alley, where a group of friends is awaiting the arrival of Salim. Meanwhile, Deepak arrives with his fiancée Sheetal. When a conversation about love arises, Deepak and the rest find it necessary to make Sheetal aware that true love does exist. They tell her the story of Raj and Priya, two of their closest friends.

Raj Mathur, a graduate of engineering, is the owner of Raj Transport, a small trucking company he founded himself. Raj is a carefree man who is unorganised, messy, lazy and never on time. Although he isn't the richest, he's always happy.

On the other hand, Priya Chopra is a successful fashion designer from a wealthy family. Originally from Greece, she lives with her aunt Anna, who wants to give her the best in life. Priya has her life all planned out – the complete opposite of Raj. These two completely different people meet in a car accident when Priya crashes her car into Raj's truck. Though the two get off to a rocky start, they meet again at the wedding of Salim and Farah, eventually becoming friends. The two slowly fall in love.

Raj learns that Priya's engaged to a man named Sameer. Desperate, he follows Priya to Greece, where he continues to woo her. When it's time to part company, Priya realises that she is in love with Raj. They get married after persuading Priya's parents, and arrive in Mumbai, where Raj welcomes Priya into their home.

Back to the bowling alley in the present: Salim arrives along with Farah and announces that today was Raj and Priya's first wedding anniversary, so they were planning a surprise party. Excited, Sheetal can't wait to meet the famous Raj and Priya, but when they do arrive, they're nothing like what they seemed. The two can't stop arguing.

Raj feels the pressure to meet the expectations of Priya's family and is struggling financially. Priya cannot stand to see her husband in this state and secretly asks her former fiancé for money. When Raj learns the truth, he becomes destructive and accuses Priya of infidelity with Sameer, causing her to run away to her parents. Raj, realizing his error, goes after Priya, only to be insulted by her family.

Priya decides to leave for Greece because she can't stay with Raj but can't stay without him. When Raj is informed of this, he races to the airport to stop Priya. He says he will change and that he has a dream of the two of them starting a family together. Although Priya expresses that she has the same dream, she feels it is impossible for them to be together, so she boards the plane. Giving up, Raj remembers his oath and sends his talisman to Priya. When Priya receives the talisman, she too recalls Raj's confession. Raj returns home to find Priya waiting for him. She says that the only way to make their dream come true is to be together. In a playful manner, the two get into another argument but they say that this is how they express their love. They continue to argue as the credits roll.

Cast
 Shah Rukh Khan as Raj Mathur
 Rani Mukerji as Priya Chopra 
 Satish Shah as Manubhai
 Lilette Dubey as Anna Mausi, Priya's aunt
 Johnny Lever as Nandu, a roadside drunkard
 Jas Arora as Sameer Arora, Priya's former fiancé
 Vishwajeet Pradhan as a friend
 Suresh Bhagwat as a Dhobi
 Aditya Pancholi as a Hostile businessman
 Dinyar Tirandaz as Irani
 Rajeev Verma as Mr. Priyanshu Chopra
 Jayshree T. as Mrs. Manubhai
 Meghna Malik as Farah Zafar
 Suresh Menon as a Shopkeeper
 Masood Akhtar as a Paanwala
 Gagan Gupta as Tambi
 Vani Tripathi as a friend
 Sushmita Daan as a flower girl
 Arun Singh as a vegetable seller
 Akhtar Nawaz as a milkman
 Kamini Khanna as female plane passenger
 Bobby Darling as a friend
 Madhavi Chopra as a friend
 Ashish Kapoor
 Jameel Khan as a traffic policeman

Development
This was the third and last film produced by Shah Rukh Khan and Juhi Chawla's company, Dreamz Unlimited. The publicity strategy of the film was designed by Kanchana Kodituwakku and Dreamz Unlimited.

Filming took place in India and Greece. Two songs of the film were shot in Athens and the island of Mykonos.

According to Khan, Mukerji was initially offered the role of Priya, but due to prior commitments, she turned it down. Post her refusal, Aishwarya Rai was signed for the role, but had to leave the film after some problems with her then-boyfriend, actor Salman Khan, who is said to have disrupted filming. This caused considerable delay in the progress of the film until Mukerji agreed to take over the role and save the film.

Mukerji had a complete makeover for the role, by MAC Cosmetics India director Mickey Contractor. Contrary to the Hindi-media prejudice of fair skin being considered more attractive, Mukerji and Contractor received praise for her new, tanned complexion, including their use of smoky-eye, which was subsequently used in other films, most notably in Mukerji's Hum Tum (2004), Veer-Zaara (2004) and Kabhi Alvida Naa Kehna (2006).

Soundtrack 

The music of the film has been conducted by the duo Jatin–Lalit and Aadesh Shrivastava. All the songs were written by Javed Akhtar.

Joginder Tuteja of Bollywood Hungama gave the album 3.5 stars and stated "Chalte Chalte is a romantic album that should go well with both class as well as mass". According to the Indian trade website Box Office India, with around 18,00,000 units sold, this film's soundtrack album was the year's sixth highest-selling.

This was one of the last collaborations of Shah Rukh Khan and Abhijeet Bhattacharya. Other artists who contributed to the album are Alka Yagnik, Udit Narayan, Sonu Nigam, Sukhwinder Singh and Preeti & Pinky.

Track listing

Box office
The film earned  during its first week. Worldwide, it is the 4th-highest-grossing film of 2003.

India

It opened on Friday, 13 June 2003 across 280 screens, and earned  nett on its opening day, which is the 7th highest first day of the year. In its opening weekend, the film grossed  nett and is the 7th highest opening of the year. It grossed  nett in its first week. The film earned a total of  nett and is the 6th-highest-grossing film of 2003. It was declared a "Hit" by Box Office India.

Overseas

Outside India, it is the second highest opening of the year as it grossed $1.15 million (5.37 crore) in its opening weekend. It went on to gross $1.58 million (7.38 crore) in its first week. The film earned a total of $2.81 million (13.13 crore) and is the 2nd-highest-grossing film of 2003 behind Kal Ho Naa Ho.

Critical reception 
Film critic Taran Adarsh praised the film's writing and performances. He wrote, "Chalte Chalte clearly belongs to Shah Rukh Khan, an actor par excellence. One actually runs out of adjectives and personifications if asked to describe this performance by the actor."

Awards

References

External links
 
 
 

Red Chillies Entertainment films
2000s Hindi-language films
Films set in Greece
2003 films
Films scored by Aadesh Shrivastava
Films scored by Jatin–Lalit
Indian drama films
UTV Motion Pictures films
Films shot in Greece
Films directed by Aziz Mirza
2003 drama films
Hindi-language drama films